Lieutenant Philip Kenneth Edward Curtis VC (7 July 1926 – 23 April 1951) was a British Army officer and a recipient of the Victoria Cross (VC), the highest award for gallantry in the face of the enemy that can be awarded to British and Commonwealth forces. Curtis was posthumously awarded the VC for his actions during the Battle of Imjin in the Korean War.

Military career
Curtis was born in Devonport in Devon, the only child of John Curtis, a labourer, and his wife, Florence . As a teenager he served as a volunteer ARP warden. In 1944 he joined the British Army, but did not go overseas. On 3 May 1946 he was commissioned into the Duke of Cornwall's Light Infantry as a second lieutenant, before being demobilized in 1948 and placed on the reserve of officers. 

After the outbreak of the Korean War in 1950, Curtis was recalled to active service and joined A company, 1st Battalion, Gloucestershire Regiment in Korea in March 1951. In late April 1951, A company was given the task of defending Castle Hill, a feature south of Imjin River, over which the Chinese were expected to attack, but isolated from the rest of the battalion. This was when the following deed took place for which Curtis, a 24-year-old lieutenant, was awarded the Victoria Cross during the Battle of Imjin.

On 22/23 April 1951 near the Imjin River, Korea, during a heavy enemy attack, No. 1 platoon under the command of Lieutenant Curtis, was ordered to carry out a counter-attack which was initially successful, but was eventually held up by heavy fire and grenades. The lieutenant then ordered some of his men to give covering fire while he himself rushed the main position of resistance. In this charge he was severely wounded but he insisted on making a second attempt. While making another desperate charge he was killed when within a few yards of his objective after throwing a grenade which destroyed the enemy position immediately after.

Anthony Farrar-Hockley, adjutant of the Glosters at Imjin River, witnessed Lieutenant Curtis' gallant deed, a desperate counterattack to regain a key position lost to the Chinese advance. At sunrise a Chinese attack was repulsed, but the British position was untenable. Below is part of Farrar-Hockley's account.

Curtis is buried in the United Nations Memorial Cemetery, Busan, Korea.

The medal
The VC investiture took place on 6 July 1954. Since Curtis's wife Joan had died before the Korean War, the investiture was attended by his mother, his seven-year-old daughter Susan and his mother-in-law, Beatrice Hayes.

His Victoria Cross is displayed at the Duke of Cornwall's Light Infantry Museum in Bodmin, Cornwall.

Citation
The War Office, 1st December 1953:

The Queen has been graciously pleased to approve the posthumous award of the Victoria Cross to Lieutenant Philip Kenneth Edward Curtis (365680), The Duke of Cornwall's Light Infantry, attached The Gloucestershire Regiment, in recognition of gallant and distinguished services in Korea.

During the first phase of the Battle of the Imjin River on the night of 22nd/23rd April 1951, "A" Company, 1 Glosters, was heavily attacked by a large enemy force. By dawn on 23rd April, the enemy had secured a footing on the 'Castle Hill' site in very close proximity to No. 2 Platoon's position. The Company Commander ordered No. 1 Platoon, under the command of Lieutenant CURTIS, to carry out a counter-attack with a view to dislodging the enemy from the position. Under the covering of medium machine guns, the counterattack, gallantly led by Lieutenant CURTIS, gained initial success but was eventually held up by heavy fire and grenades. Enemy from just below the crest of the hill were rushed to reinforce the position and a fierce fire-fight developed, grenades also being freely used by both sides in this close quarter engagement. Lieutenant CURTIS ordered some of his men to give him covering fire while he himself rushed the main position of resistance; in this charge Lieutenant CURTIS was severely wounded by a grenade. Several of his men crawled out and pulled him back under cover but, recovering himself, Lieutenant CURTIS insisted on making a second attempt. Breaking free from the men who wished to restrain him, he made another desperate charge, hurling grenades as he went, but was killed by a burst of fire when within a few yards of his objective.

Although the immediate objective of this counter-attack was not achieved, it had yet a great effect on the subsequent course of the battle; for although the enemy had gained a footing on a position vital to the defence of the whole Company area, this success had resulted in such furious reaction that they made no further effort to exploit their success in this immediate area; had they done so, the eventual withdrawal of the Company might well have proved impossible.

Lieutenant CURTIS's conduct was magnificent throughout this bitter battle.

References

External links

1926 births
1951 deaths
British Army personnel of the Korean War
British Army personnel of World War II
British Army recipients of the Victoria Cross
British military personnel killed in the Korean War
British recipients of the Victoria Cross
Duke of Cornwall's Light Infantry officers
Gloucestershire Regiment officers
Military personnel from Plymouth, Devon